Abdel-Latif Abu-Rajelha Stadium, formerly known as Zamalek Stadium then Mohammed Hassan Helmy "Zamora" Stadium, is a multi-use stadium in Cairo, Egypt. The stadium was initially named in honor of Mohammed Hassan Helmy, the former player and president of Zamalek. It was then renamed in 2014 to Abdel-Latif Abu-Rajelha Stadium after the former president of Zamalek Abdel-Latif Abu-Rajelha. It is currently used mostly for football matches and was the home of Zamalek before they moved to Cairo International Stadium because of the small capacity. The stadium held as high as 40,000 spectators before the capacity was reduced to 20,000 as controls were put in place.

Stadium Inauguration
The stadium was officially opened in 1959, hosting a soccer match between Zamalek SC and Dukla Prague. Before the match kick-off, an aircraft dropped the ball into the field. The aircraft flew at a low altitude, which made some players lie flat. The inauguration match ended by Zamalek SC defeating Dukla Prague by a score of two goals to nil, scored by Abdou Noshi and Essam Baheeg.

Stadium Accident

In 1974 the stadium saw a deadly stampede at a friendly match between Zamalek SC and Dukla Prague, as at least 48 people were killed when the front fence of a stand was knocked down. The friendly match was subsequently cancelled.

References

External links
ملعبا الأهلي والزمالك.. ماذا تعرف عن التتش وأبو رجيلة - Dot Masr

Defunct football venues in Egypt